Roberto Ismael Meraz Bernal (born 4 August 1999) is a Mexican professional footballer who plays as a defensive midfielder for Liga MX club Mazatlán.

International career
In April 2019, Meraz was included in the 21-player squad to represent Mexico at the U-20 World Cup in Poland.

Career statistics

Club

References

External links
 
 
 Roberto Meraz at SofaScore Stats 
 Roberto Meraz at Enascenso (debut)

1999 births
Living people
Mexican footballers
Mexico youth international footballers
Atlético Morelia players
Liga MX players
Sportspeople from Culiacán
Footballers from Sinaloa
Association football midfielders